CBEE may refer to:

 CBEE-FM, a radio station (88.1 FM) licensed to serve Chatham, Ontario, Canada
 China Beijing Environmental Exchange
 Combined Biotechnology Entrance Exam